Polyphème was a  74-gun ship of the line of the French Navy.

Career 
Ordered in October  1812, Polyphème was one of the ships built in the various shipyards captured by the First French Empire in Holland and Italy in a crash programme to replenish the ranks of the French Navy.

The Dutch seized her, still on keel, after the French evacuated Amsterdam, and commissioned her in the Royal Netherlands Navy as Holland. She was broken up in 1832.

Notes, citations, and references

Notes

Citations

References

Ships of the line of the French Navy
Téméraire-class ships of the line
1817 ships
Ships of the line of the Netherlands